John Shaw was a professional rugby league footballer who played in the 1910s.

Playing career

Club career
John Shaw made his début for Warrington in the heavy defeat by Hull F.C. at The Boulevard, Hull on 17 January 1914.

References

External links
Search for "Shaw" at rugbyleagueproject.org

Place of birth missing
Place of death missing
English rugby league players
Rugby league centres
Warrington Wolves players
Year of birth missing
Year of death missing